The San Francisco Legacy was the last original franchise of the National Women's Basketball League (NWBL).  Originally established in 2001 as the Kansas City Legacy, the franchise moved in 2003 to Knoxville, Tennessee and became the Tennessee Fury.  Then in 2004 it moved to Dallas, and was known as the Dallas Fury, where it won the league championship that year.  The team moved to Oakland and took its original name in 2006.

Team record
2001 - 
2002 - 
2003 - 
2004 - 
2005 - 
2006 - 0–18

External links
NWBL website (archive link)

Sports teams in Oakland, California
Basketball teams in the San Francisco Bay Area